William Robert Allison (July 11, 1934 – April 9, 1995) was an American professional baseball outfielder who played for the Washington Senators / Minnesota Twins of Major League Baseball from  to .

Allison attended the University of Kansas for two years and was a star outfielder on the baseball team and fullback on the football team. In his Major League career, he hit 30 or more home runs three times and 20 or more in eight different seasons. Although he struck out often like many sluggers, reaching the century mark in strikeouts in five seasons, he received more than his share of walks and despite a mediocre career .255 batting average, Allison finished with a lifetime on-base percentage (OBP) of .358 and he finished in the top 10 in OBP in four seasons. Allison wasn't an especially fast player, but he was among the most feared base-runners of his time in hustling out numerous doubles and triples – leading the league in triples in 1959 (with 9) and finishing in the top 10 twice in doubles (1960 & 1964) and four times in triples (1959, 1962, 1967, and 1968).

At the three outfield positions he showed good range, finishing in the top five in range factor per nine innings five times, and his strong arm was rated as one of the best in the league. He also played a solid first base late at his career and his competitive attitude was highly praised by teammates and opponents. Despite his skill in the field, which saw him finish in the top 5 in the American League in outfield assists three times (1961, 1962, and 1965) and outfield putouts twice (1959 and 1963), he also produced many errors and Allison led the league with 11 errors in 1960, finished second twice (1959 and 1963), and finished fourth in errors by a first baseman in 1964.

Baseball career
After leaving the University of Kansas at the age of 20, Allison was signed by the Senators as an amateur free agent before the start of the 1955 season. After signing, he was assigned to the Hagerstown Packets of the B-level Piedmont League where he hit only .256 in 122 games. The following year, he was promoted to the Charlotte Hornets in the single-A South Atlantic League.  Although he improved his power numbers, hitting 12 home runs and 6 triples, his batting average dipped to .233.  Allison then spent 1957 and 1958 playing for the Chattanooga Lookouts of the AA Southern League and he raised batting average and slugging percentage to .307 and .446 respectively in 1958 (both highs in his minor league career). On September 16, 1958, Allison made his major league debut, batted lead-off, and got a single in four at-bats in a 5–1 loss to the Cleveland Indians.

In , Allison went north with the Senators and he batted .261 with 30 home runs and 85 runs batted in; led the league in triples (9), was named to the All-Star team, received a smattering of MVP votes, and was honored by being voted Rookie of the Year. Allison experienced a "sophomore slump" in 1960 with an across-the-board drop in his offensive statistics. However, he came back strong in 1961, hitting 29 home runs and 105 RBI, although his batting average dropped for the second year in a row, to .245.

In , Allison had 25 doubles, 35 home runs, 91 RBI, led the league in runs scored (99) and in OPS (.911), and earned his second All-Star berth. In addition, he became the first of four Twins to lead the league in WAR, a stat that measures a player's overall production both in the field and at the plate, (along with teammate Zoilo Versalles, Rod Carew, and Joe Mauer) and the only one not to win the MVP in the same season (finishing a distant 15th behind winner Elston Howard and behind teammates Camilo Pascual, Earl Battey, and Killebrew on the 1963 ballot). The next year, Allison suffered a broken left hand when he was hit by a pitch and missed 91 games, but returned at the end of the season to knock a pinch-hit three-run homer against the New York Yankees.

During the Twins 1965 World Series season, Allison had a down year, hitting only .233 in 135 games, and continued his poor production versus the Los Angeles Dodgers, reaching base only 4 times (two walks, a double, and a home run) and striking out 9 times in 16 at-bats, the last of which was against Sandy Koufax for the final out in Game 7 of the 1965 World Series. However, he had a memorable Game 2 of the Series.  His bases-loaded double against Koufax and a great backhand diving catch of a Jim Lefebvre fly ball were the main contributors to the Twins victory. This catch has been called the best catch in Twins history and one of the most spectacular catches seen in World Series history. Allison's slide at the plate continued into the 1966 season and he played in only 70 games and hit .233. However, he returned in a big way in 1967, hitting .258 with 24 home runs with 75 RBI in a year which the league batting average was only .236.

In 13 seasons, Allison finished in the top ten in home runs eight times (1959, 1961–65, 1967–68). Particularly memorable home run feats included combining with Harmon Killebrew to become the first pair to hit grand slams in the same inning on July 18, 1962, hitting home runs in three consecutive at-bats on May 17, 1963, and teaming with Killebrew, Tony Oliva, and Jimmie Hall to hit four consecutive home runs on May 2, 1964.

Retirement
During his baseball career, he worked during the off season in sales for Coca-Cola Bottling Midwest Co. in suburban Minneapolis and after retirement, he continued with that business, becoming a plant manager and a sales manager Coca-Cola's Twin Cities Marketing Division. Thirteen years after his retirement, Allison began noticing problems with his coordination during a 1987 old-timers game at the Hubert H. Humphrey Metrodome. Running and even catching the ball became difficult. Following two years of doctor visits to learn what was wrong, the diagnosis was finally made — Allison was suffering from a progressive sporadic ataxia known as Olivo-Ponto cerebellar atrophy. In 1990, Allison helped found the Bob Allison Ataxia Research Center at the University of Minnesota along with his wife Betty, sons Mark, Kirk, and Kyle, and former Twins' teammates Jim Kaat and Frank Quilici. He continued to battle this rare degenerative neurological disease for eight years, eventually losing his ability to walk, talk, write, and feed himself. Allison died of complications from ataxia on April 9, 1995 at the age of 60 in his Rio Verde, Arizona home.

Following his death, the Minnesota Twins created the Bob Allison Award for the Twins player who exemplifies determination, hustle, tenacity, competitive spirit and leadership both on and off the field.

See also

 List of Major League Baseball annual runs scored leaders
 List of Major League Baseball annual triples leaders
 List of Major League Baseball players who spent their entire career with one franchise
 List of Major League Baseball career home run leaders

References

External links

 

1934 births
1995 deaths
American League All-Stars
Baseball players from Missouri
Charlotte Hornets (baseball) players
Chattanooga Lookouts players
Hagerstown Packets players
Kansas Jayhawks baseball players
Major League Baseball outfielders
Major League Baseball Rookie of the Year Award winners
Minnesota Twins announcers
Minnesota Twins players
Neurological disease deaths in Arizona
People from Raytown, Missouri
Washington Senators (1901–1960) players
American expatriate baseball players in Cuba